Klaas de Groot (born 3 November 1940, Bergen, Limburg) is Emeritus Professor at the Tissue Engineering Group at the University of Twente. In the past he also worked as a visiting scientist at the UCLA bone research laboratory. His work has focused on the research and development of bioceramics that resemble the composition of bone. He has developed two types of bioceramic, namely bulk ceramics (dense, porous, large and small) for mechanically unloaded bone fillers, and coatings for improving the bone bonding of strong, but less biocompatible, metallic orthopedic and dental implants. His group also studied the incorporation of drugs and growth factors such as Bone Morphogenetic Proteins (BMP) into such ceramics and coatings, as well as the use of calciumphosphate particles for plastic surgery, i.e. filling and augmenting soft and hard tissues for cosmetic reasons).

CAM Implants
His research products are being marketed by CAM Implants (now Cam Bioceramics), IsoTis and Stryker (USA).

Prior to his present appointment he worked at Vrije Universiteit (VU), Amsterdam (until 1988) and Leiden University (until 2001), at both places as head of the department of biomaterials.

He is a co-founder of CAM Implants BV (now Cam Bioceramics), and IsoTis. He has published more than 350 articles and he is the co-inventor of about 10 patents.

References

1940 births
Living people
Dutch bioengineers
University of Groningen alumni
Academic staff of Leiden University
Academic staff of Vrije Universiteit Amsterdam
Academic staff of the University of Twente
People from Bergen, Limburg